The Best of P.M. Dawn is a 2000 compilation album by P.M. Dawn. Along with the group's most successful recordings, it includes remixes of some of their minor hits, and "Gotta Be...Movin' on Up" from the 1998 Marlon Wayans and David Spade comedy Senseless performed by Attrell Cordes (of P.M. Dawn) featuring Ky-mani Marley and John Forte.

Track listing
 "Set Adrift on Memory Bliss" (radio edit)
 "Paper Doll"
 "I'd Die Without You"
 "Looking Through Patient Eyes"
 "The Ways of the Wind"
 "Downtown Venus"
 "Sometimes I Miss You So Much"
 "Gotta Be...Movin' On Up"
 "Being So Not for You (I Had No Right)"
 "Faith in You"
 "A Watcher's Point of View (Don't 'Cha Think)" (Todd Terry's Hard House Mix)
 "The Ways of the Wind" (Main 7in)
 "Reality Used to Be a Friend of Mine" (CJ Macintosh 7in Edit)
 "Gotta Be...Movin' On Up" (Morales Radio Edit)

References

P.M. Dawn albums
2000 greatest hits albums
V2 Records compilation albums